Saint-Gauzens is a commune in the Tarn department in southern France.

Geography
The commune is traversed by the river Dadou.

See also
Communes of the Tarn department

References

Communes of Tarn (department)